Iryna Balashova is a paralympic swimmer from Ukraine competing mainly in category S13 events.

Iryna competed at the 2008 Summer Paralympics as part of the Ukrainian team.  She finished in fifth in the 100 m backstroke and 100 m freestyle as well as winning bronze medal in the 50 m freestyle.

References

External links
 

Paralympic swimmers of Ukraine
Swimmers at the 2008 Summer Paralympics
Swimmers at the 2012 Summer Paralympics
Paralympic bronze medalists for Ukraine
Ukrainian female freestyle swimmers
Living people
Medalists at the 2008 Summer Paralympics
Year of birth missing (living people)
Medalists at the World Para Swimming Championships
Medalists at the World Para Swimming European Championships
Paralympic medalists in swimming
Ukrainian female backstroke swimmers
Ukrainian female breaststroke swimmers
S13-classified Paralympic swimmers
21st-century Ukrainian women